Brandon Douglas (born 17 August 1997) is a professional rugby league footballer who plays as a  or second row forward for Sheffield Eagles in Betfred Championship.

He spent the 2018 season on loan from the Castleford Tigers (Heritage № 972) in the Super League at Halifax in the Betfred Championship. In November 2021 he joined Sheffield Eagles on a two-year deal.

References

External links
Halifax profile
Castleford Tigers profile
Cas Tigers profile
SL profile

1997 births
Living people
Castleford Tigers players
Dewsbury Rams players
Doncaster R.L.F.C. players
English rugby league players
Halifax R.L.F.C. players
Place of birth missing (living people)
Rugby league props
Rugby league second-rows
Sheffield Eagles players